Brett Darby (born 10 November 1983) is a former professional footballer who played in the Football League as a midfielder for Southend United.

External links

Brett Darby profile at TheGingerBreads.co.uk

1983 births
Living people
Footballers from Leicester
Association football midfielders
English footballers
Leicester City F.C. players
Southend United F.C. players
Tamworth F.C. players
Grantham Town F.C. players
Corby Town F.C. players
Stamford A.F.C. players
Quorn F.C. players
Rothwell Town F.C. players
Shepshed Dynamo F.C. players
English Football League players